Dawn is a retired space probe that was launched by NASA in September 2007 with the mission of studying two of the three known protoplanets of the asteroid belt: Vesta and Ceres. In the fulfillment of that mission—the ninth in NASA's Discovery Program—Dawn entered orbit around Vesta on July 16, 2011, and completed a 14-month survey mission before leaving for Ceres in late 2012. It entered orbit around Ceres on March 6, 2015. In 2017, NASA announced that the planned nine-year mission would be extended until the probe's hydrazine fuel supply was depleted. On November 1, 2018, NASA announced that Dawn had depleted its hydrazine, and the mission was ended. The spacecraft is currently in a derelict, but stable, orbit around Ceres.

Dawn is the first spacecraft to orbit two extraterrestrial bodies, the first spacecraft to visit either Vesta or Ceres, and the first to orbit a dwarf planet.

The Dawn mission was managed by NASA's Jet Propulsion Laboratory, with spacecraft components contributed by European partners from Italy, Germany, France, and the Netherlands. It was the first NASA exploratory mission to use ion propulsion, which enabled it to enter and leave the orbit of two celestial bodies. Previous multi-target missions using rockets powered by chemical engine, such as the Voyager program, were restricted to flybys.

Project history

Technological background

The first working ion thruster in the US was built by Harold R. Kaufman in 1959 at NASA's Glenn Research Center in Ohio. The thruster was similar to the general design of a gridded electrostatic ion thruster with mercury as its propellant. Suborbital tests of the engine followed during the 1960s, and in 1964 the engine was tested on a suborbital flight aboard the Space Electric Rocket Test 1 (SERT 1). It successfully operated for the planned 31 minutes before falling back to Earth. This test was followed by an orbital test, SERT-2, in 1970.

Deep Space 1 (DS1), which NASA launched in 1998, demonstrated the long-duration use of a xenon-propelled ion thruster on a science mission, and validated a number of technologies, including the NSTAR electrostatic ion thruster, as well as performing a flyby of an asteroid and a comet. In addition to the ion thruster, among the other technologies validated by the DS1 was the Small Deep Space Transponder, which is used on Dawn for long-range communication.

Discovery Program selection
Twenty-six proposals were submitted to the Discovery Program solicitation, with budget initially targeted at US$300 million. Three semi-finalists were downselected in January 2001 for a phase-A design study: Dawn, Kepler, and INSIDE Jupiter.   In December 2001 NASA selected the Kepler and the Dawn mission for the Discovery program. Both missions were initially selected for a launch in 2006.

Cancellation and reinstatement
The status of the Dawn mission changed several times. The project was cancelled in December 2003, and then reinstated in February 2004. In October 2005, work on Dawn was placed in "stand down" mode, and in January 2006, the mission was discussed in the press as "indefinitely postponed", even though NASA had made no new announcements regarding its status. On March 2, 2006, Dawn was again cancelled by NASA.

The spacecraft's manufacturer, Orbital Sciences Corporation, appealed NASA's decision, offering to build the spacecraft at cost, forgoing any profit in order to gain experience in a new market field. NASA then put the cancellation under review, and on March 27, 2006, it was announced that the mission would not be cancelled after all. In the last week of September 2006, the Dawn mission's instrument payload integration reached full functionality. Although originally projected to cost US$373 million, cost overruns inflated the final cost of the mission to US$446 million in 2007. Christopher T. Russell was chosen to lead the Dawn mission team.

Scientific background

The Dawn mission was designed to study two large bodies in the asteroid belt in order to answer questions about the formation of the Solar System, as well as to test the performance of its ion thrusters in deep space. Ceres and Vesta were chosen as two contrasting protoplanets, the first one apparently "wet" (i.e. icy and cold) and the other "dry" (i.e. rocky), whose accretion was terminated by the formation of Jupiter. The two bodies provide a bridge in scientific understanding between the formation of rocky planets and the icy bodies of the Solar System, and under what conditions a rocky planet can hold water.

The International Astronomical Union (IAU) adopted a new definition of planet on August 24, 2006, which introduced the term "dwarf planet" for ellipsoidal worlds that were too small to qualify for planetary status by "clearing their orbital neighborhood" of other orbiting matter. Dawn is the first mission to study a dwarf planet, arriving at Ceres a few months before the arrival of the New Horizons probe at Pluto in July 2015.

Ceres comprises a third of the total mass of the asteroid belt. Its spectral characteristics suggest a composition similar to that of a water-rich carbonaceous chondrite. Vesta, a smaller, water-poor achondritic asteroid comprising a tenth of the mass of the asteroid belt, has experienced significant heating and differentiation. It shows signs of a metallic core, a Mars-like density and lunar-like basaltic flows.

Available evidence indicates that both bodies formed very early in the history of the Solar System, thereby retaining a record of events and processes from the time of the formation of the terrestrial planets. Radionuclide dating of pieces of meteorites thought to come from Vesta suggests that Vesta differentiated quickly, in three million years or less. Thermal evolution studies suggest that Ceres must have formed some time later, more than three million years after the formation of CAIs (the oldest known objects of Solar System origin).

Moreover, Vesta appears to be the source of many smaller objects in the Solar System. Most (but not all) V-type near-Earth asteroids, and some outer main-belt asteroids, have spectra similar to Vesta, and are thus known as vestoids. Five percent of the meteoritic samples found on Earth, the howardite–eucrite–diogenite (HED) meteorites, are thought to be the result of a collision or collisions with Vesta.

It is thought that Ceres may have a differentiated interior; its oblateness appears too small for an undifferentiated body, which indicates that it consists of a rocky core overlain with an icy mantle. There is a large collection of potential samples from Vesta accessible to scientists, in the form of over 1,400 HED meteorites, giving insight into Vesta geologic history and structure. Vesta is thought to consist of a metallic iron–nickel core, an overlying rocky olivine mantle and crust.

Objectives

The Dawn mission's goal was to characterize the conditions and processes of the Solar System's earliest eon by investigating in detail two of the largest protoplanets remaining intact since their formation.

Although the mission has finished, the data analyses and interpretations will continue for many years. The primary question that the mission addresses is the role of size and water in determining the evolution of the planets. Ceres and Vesta are highly suitable bodies with which to address this question, as they are two of the most massive of the protoplanets. Ceres is geologically very primitive and icy, while Vesta is evolved and rocky. Their contrasting characteristics are thought to have resulted from them forming in two different regions of the early Solar System.

There are three principal scientific drivers for the mission. First, the Dawn mission can capture the earliest moments in the origin of the Solar System, granting an insight into the conditions under which these objects formed. Second, Dawn determines the nature of the building blocks from which the terrestrial planets formed, improving scientific understanding of this formation. Finally, it contrasts the formation and evolution of two small planets that followed very different evolutionary paths, allowing scientists to determine what factors control that evolution.

Instruments

NASA's Jet Propulsion Laboratory provided overall planning and management of the mission, the flight system and scientific payload development, and provided the ion propulsion system. Orbital Sciences Corporation provided the spacecraft, which constituted the company's first interplanetary mission. The Max Planck Institute for Solar System Research and the German Aerospace Center (DLR) provided the framing cameras, the Italian Space Agency provided the mapping spectrometer, and the Los Alamos National Laboratory provided the gamma ray and neutron spectrometer.

Framing camera (FC) — Two redundant framing camera were flown. Each used a f/7.9 refractive optical system with a focal length of 150 mm. A frame-transfer charge-coupled device (CCD), a Thomson TH7888A, at the focal plane has 1024 × 1024 sensitive 93-μrad pixels, imaging a 5.5° x 5.5° field of view. An 8-position filter wheel permits panchromatic (clear filter) and spectrally selective imaging (7 narrow band filters). The broadest filter allows imaging at wavelengths from 400 to 1050 nm. The FC computer is a custom radiation-hardened Xilinx system with a LEON2 core and 8 GiB of memory. The camera offered  resolutions of 17 m/pixel for Vesta and 66 m/pixel for Ceres. Because the framing camera was vital for both science and navigation, the payload had two identical and physically separate cameras (FC1 & FC2) for redundancy, each with its own optics, electronics, and structure.
Visible and infrared spectrometer (VIR) — This instrument is a modification of the visible and infrared thermal-imaging spectrometer used on the Rosetta and Venus Express spacecraft. It draws its heritage from the Saturn orbiter Cassinis visible and infrared mapping spectrometer. The spectrometer's VIR spectral frames are 256 (spatial) × 432 (spectral), and the slit length is 64 mrad. The mapping spectrometer incorporates two channels, both fed by a single grating. A CCD yields frames from 0.25 to 1.0 μm, while an array of HgCdTe photodiodes cooled to about 70K spans the spectrum from 0.95 to 5.0 μm.
Gamma Ray and Neutron Detector (GRaND) — This instrument is based on similar instruments flown on the Lunar Prospector and Mars Odyssey space missions. It had 21 sensors with a very wide field of view. It was be used to measure the abundances of the major rock-forming elements (oxygen, magnesium, aluminium, silicon, calcium, titanium, and iron) and potassium, thorium, uranium, and water (inferred from hydrogen content) in the top 1m of the surface of Vesta and Ceres.

A magnetometer and laser altimeter were considered for the mission, but were not ultimately flown.

Specifications

Dimensions
The main antenna is five feet (1.24 meters) in diameter.

Propulsion system
The Dawn spacecraft was propelled by three xenon ion thrusters derived from NSTAR technology used by the Deep Space 1 spacecraft, using one at a time. They have a specific impulse of 3,100 s and produce a thrust of 90 mN. The whole spacecraft, including the ion propulsion thrusters, was powered by a 10 kW (at 1 AU) triple-junction gallium arsenide photovoltaic solar array manufactured by Dutch Space. With the propellant it carried, Dawn was able to perform a velocity change of approximately 11 km/s over the course of its mission, far more than any previous spacecraft achieved with onboard propellant after separation from its launch rocket. However, the thrust was very gentle; it took four days at full throttle to accelerate Dawn from zero to 60 mph (96 km/h). 
Dawn is NASA's first purely exploratory mission to use ion propulsion engines. The spacecraft also has twelve 0.9 N hydrazine thrusters for attitude control (orientation), which were also used to assist in orbital insertion.

The Dawn spacecraft was able to achieve a record-breaking level of propulsion from its ion engine. NASA noted three specific areas of excellence: 
First to orbit two different astronomical bodies (not including Earth).
Solar-electric propulsion record, including a velocity change in space of 25,700 mph (11.49 km/second). This is 2.7x the velocity change by solar-electric ion drive than the past record.
Achieved 5.9 years of ion engine runtime by September 7, 2018. This amount of runtime equates to 54% of Dawn's time in outer space.

Outreach microchip
Dawn carries a memory chip bearing the names of more than 360,000 space enthusiasts. The names were submitted online as part of a public outreach effort between September 2005 and November 4, 2006. The microchip, which is two centimetres in diameter, was installed on May 17, 2007, above the spacecraft's forward ion thruster, underneath its high-gain antenna. More than one microchip was made, with a back-up copy put on display at the 2007 Open House event at the Jet Propulsion Laboratory in Pasadena, California.

Mission summary

Launch preparations
On April 10, 2007, the spacecraft arrived at the Astrotech Space Operations subsidiary of SPACEHAB, Inc. in Titusville, Florida, where it was prepared for launch. The launch was originally scheduled for June 20, but was delayed until June 30 due to delays with part deliveries. A broken crane at the launch pad, used to raise the solid rocket boosters, further delayed the launch for a week, until July 7; prior to this, on June 15, the second stage was successfully hoisted into position. A mishap at the Astrotech Space Operations facility, involving slight damage to one of the solar arrays, did not have an effect on the launch date; however, bad weather caused the launch to slip to July 8. Range tracking problems then delayed the launch to July 9, and then July 15. Launch planning was then suspended in order to avoid conflicts with the Phoenix mission to Mars, which was successfully launched on August 4.

Launch

The launch of Dawn was rescheduled for September 26, 2007, then September 27, due to bad weather delaying fueling of the second stage, the same problem that delayed the July 7 launch attempt. The launch window extended from 07:20–07:49 EDT (11:20–11:49 GMT). During the final built-in hold at T−4 minutes, a ship entered the exclusion area offshore, the strip of ocean where the rocket boosters were likely to fall after separation. After commanding the ship to leave the area, the launch was required to wait for the end of a collision avoidance window with the International Space Station. Dawn finally launched from pad 17-B at the Cape Canaveral Air Force Station on a Delta 7925-H rocket at 07:34 EDT, reaching escape velocity with the help of a spin-stabilized solid-fueled third stage. Thereafter, Dawn's ion thrusters took over.

Transit to Vesta
After initial testing, during which the ion thrusters accumulated more than 11 days 14 hours of operation, Dawn began long-term cruise propulsion on December 17, 2007. On October 31, 2008, Dawn completed its first thrusting phase to send it on to Mars for a gravity assist flyby in February 2009. During this first interplanetary cruise phase, Dawn spent 270 days, or 85% of this phase, using its thrusters. It expended less than 72 kilograms of xenon propellant for a total change in velocity of 1.81 km/s. On November 20, 2008, Dawn performed its first trajectory correction maneuver (TCM1), firing its number 1 thruster for 2 hours, 11 minutes.

Dawn made its closest approach (549 km) to Mars on February 17, 2009, during a successful gravity assist. On this day, the spacecraft placed itself in safe mode, resulting in some data acquisition loss. The spacecraft was reported to be back in full operation two days later, with no impact on the subsequent mission identified. The root cause of the event was reported to be a software programming error.

To cruise from Earth to its targets, Dawn traveled in an elongated outward spiral trajectory. The actual Vesta chronology and estimated Ceres chronology are as follows:
September 27, 2007: launch
February 17, 2009: Mars gravity assist
July 16, 2011: Vesta arrival and capture
August 11–31, 2011: Vesta survey orbit
September 29, 2011 – November 2, 2011: Vesta first high altitude orbit
December 12, 2011 – May 1, 2012: Vesta low altitude orbit
June 15, 2012 – July 25, 2012: Vesta second high altitude orbit
September 5, 2012: Vesta departure
March 6, 2015: Ceres arrival
June 30, 2016: End of primary Ceres operations
July 1, 2016: Beginning of Ceres extended mission
November 1, 2018: End of Mission

Vesta approach
As Dawn approached Vesta, the Framing Camera instrument took progressively higher-resolution images, which were published online and at news conferences by NASA and MPI.

On May 3, 2011, Dawn acquired its first targeting image, 1,200,000 km from Vesta, and began its approach phase to the asteroid. On June 12, Dawn's speed relative to Vesta was slowed in preparation for its orbital insertion 34 days later.

Dawn was scheduled to be inserted into orbit at 05:00 UTC on July 16 after a period of thrusting with its ion engines. Because its antenna was pointed away from the Earth during thrusting, scientists were not able to immediately confirm whether or not Dawn successfully made the maneuver. The spacecraft would then reorient itself, and was scheduled to check in at 06:30 UTC on July 17. NASA later confirmed that it received telemetry from Dawn indicating that the spacecraft successfully entered orbit around Vesta, making it the first spacecraft to orbit an object in the asteroid belt. The exact time of insertion could not be confirmed, since it depended on Vesta's mass distribution, which was not precisely known and at that time had only been estimated.

Vesta orbit
After being captured by Vesta's gravity and entering its orbit on July 16, 2011, Dawn moved to a lower, closer orbit by running its xenon-ion engine using solar power.

The scientists stated that they think that Vesta is the "last of its kind" – the only remaining example of the large planetoids that came together to form the rocky planets during the formation of the Solar System. In October 2012, further Dawn results were published, on the origin of anomalous dark spots and streaks on Vesta's surface, which were likely deposited by ancient asteroid impacts. In December 2012, it was reported that Dawn had observed gullies on the surface of Vesta that were interpreted to have been eroded by transiently flowing liquid water. More details about the Dawn mission's scientific discoveries at Vesta are included on the Vesta page.

Dawn was originally scheduled to depart Vesta and begin its two and a half year journey to Ceres on August 26, 2012. However, a problem with one of the spacecraft's reaction wheels forced Dawn to delay its departure from Vesta's gravity until September 5, 2012.

Transit to Ceres

During its time in orbit around Vesta, the probe experienced several failures of its reaction wheels. Investigators planned to modify their activities upon arrival at Ceres for close range geographical survey mapping. The Dawn team stated that they would orient the probe using a "hybrid" mode utilizing both reaction wheels and ion thrusters. Engineers determined that this hybrid mode would conserve fuel. On November 13, 2013, during the transit, in a test preparation, Dawn engineers completed a 27-hour-long series of exercises of said hybrid mode.

On September 11, 2014, Dawn ion thruster unexpectedly ceased firing and the probe began operating in a triggered safe mode. To avoid a lapse in propulsion, the mission team hastily exchanged the active ion engine and electrical controller with another. The team stated that they had a plan in place to revive this disabled component later in 2014. The controller in the ion propulsion system may have been damaged by a high-energy particle. Upon exiting the safe mode on September 15, 2014, the probe's ion thruster resumed normal operation.

Furthermore, the Dawn investigators also found that, after the propulsion issue, Dawn could not aim its main communications antenna towards Earth. Another antenna of weaker capacity was instead temporarily retasked. To correct the problem, the probe's computer was reset and the aiming mechanism of the main antenna was restored.

Ceres approach
Dawn began photographing an extended disk of Ceres on December 1, 2014, with images of partial rotations on January 13 and 25, 2015 released as animations.
Images taken from Dawn of Ceres after January 26, 2015, exceeded the resolution of comparable images from the Hubble Space Telescope.

Progression of images of Ceres taken by Dawn between January and March 2015

Because of the failure of two reaction wheels, Dawn made fewer camera observations of Ceres during its approach phase than it did during its Vesta approach. Camera observations required turning the spacecraft, which consumed precious hydrazine fuel. Seven optical navigation photo sessions (OpNav 1–7, on January 13 and 25, February 3 and 25, March 1, and April 10 and 15) and two full rotation observation sessions (RC1–2, on February 12 and 19) were planned before full observation begins with orbital capture. The gap in March and early April was due to a period when Ceres appears too close to the Sun from Dawn vantage point to take pictures safely.

Ceres orbit

Dawn entered Ceres orbit on March 6, 2015, four months prior to the arrival of New Horizons at Pluto. Dawn thus became the first mission to study a dwarf planet at close range. Dawn initially entered a polar orbit around Ceres, and continued to refine its orbit. It obtained its first full topographic map of Ceres during this period.

The RC3 orbit lasted 15 days, during which Dawn alternated taking pictures and sensor measurements and then relayed the resulting data back to Earth. On May 9, 2015, Dawn powered its ion engines and began a month-long spiral descent down to its second mapping point, a Survey orbit, three times closer to Ceres than the previous orbit. The spacecraft stopped twice to take images of Ceres during its spiral descent into the new orbit.

In the new Survey orbit, Dawn circled Ceres every three Earth days. The Survey phase lasted 22 days (7 orbits), and was designed to obtain a global view of Ceres with Dawn framing camera, and generate detailed global maps with the visible and infrared mapping spectrometer (VIR).

On June 30, 2015, Dawn experienced a software glitch when an anomaly in its orientation system occurred. It responded by going into safe mode and sending a signal to engineers, who fixed the error on July 2, 2015.  Engineers determined the cause of the anomaly to be related to the mechanical gimbal system associated with one of Dawn's ion engines.  After switching to a separate ion engine and conducting tests from July 14 through July 16, 2015, engineers certified the ability to continue the mission.

On August 17, 2015, Dawn entered the HAMO orbit (High-Altitude Mapping Orbit). During this phase, Dawn continued to acquire near-global maps with the VIR and framing camera at higher resolution than in the Survey phase. It also imaged in stereo to resolve the surface in 3D.

Since reaching this fourth orbit in December 2015, Dawn was scheduled to acquire data for the next three months with its gamma-ray and neutron detector (GRaND) and other instruments that identified the composition at the surface.

Having surpassed its mapping objectives, Dawn climbed to its fifth science orbit of  beginning on September 2, 2016, to complete additional observations from a different angle. The return to a higher altitude allowed for a second set of data at this altitude, which improves the overall science quality when added to the first batch. However, this time the spacecraft was placed where it was not spiraling and was orbiting in the same direction as Ceres, which reduced propellant consumption.

Mission conclusion
A flyby of the asteroid 2 Pallas after the completion of the Ceres mission was suggested but never formally considered; orbiting Pallas would not have been possible for Dawn, due to the high inclination of Pallas' orbit relative to Ceres.

In April 2016, the Dawn project team submitted a proposal to NASA for an extended mission that would have seen the spacecraft break orbit from Ceres and perform a flyby of the asteroid 145 Adeona in May 2019, arguing that the science gained from visiting a third asteroid might outweigh the returns from staying at Ceres. NASA's Planetary Mission Senior Review Panel, however, declined the proposal in May 2016. A one-year mission extension was approved, but the review panel ordered that Dawn remain at Ceres, stating that the long-term observations of the dwarf planet, particularly as it approached perihelion, would potentially yield better science.

The one-year extension expired on June 30, 2017. The spacecraft was placed in an uncontrolled but relatively stable orbit around Ceres, where it ran out of hydrazine propellant by October 31, 2018, and where it will remain as a "monument" for at least 20 years.

Media

High-resolution image

Ceres atlas images

Maps of Ceres

Flyover videos

See also

Features on Ceres
 Ahuna Mons, a mountain on Ceres
 Bright spots on Ceres
 List of geological features on Ceres
Other asteroid missions
 List of minor planets and comets visited by spacecraft
 Chang'e 2  4179 Toutatis flyby
 Galileo probe  951 Gaspra and 243 Ida flybys
 Hayabusa  25143 Itokawa rendezvous and sample return
 Hayabusa2  162173 Ryugu rendezvous and sample return
 NEAR Shoemaker  253 Mathilde flyby, orbited 433 Eros from 2000 to 2001
 OSIRIS-REx  101955 Bennu sample return mission
 Rosetta  2867 Šteins and 21 Lutetia flyby

References

External links

 Dawn website by Jet Propulsion Laboratory
 Dawn website by NASA
 Dawn public data archives by UCLA
 Dawn Legacy – Video (03:04) by NASA (September 7, 2018).
 Dawn Mission Archive at the NASA Planetary Data System, Small Bodies Node

 Instruments
 Framing Cameras by the Max Planck Institute for Solar System Research
 Visual and Infrared Spectrometer  by the Istituto Nazionale di Astrofisica
 Gamma Ray and Neutron Spectrometer by NASA (journal paper)

Discovery Program
Missions to main-belt asteroids
Missions to dwarf planets
Orbiters (space probe)
NASA space probes
4 Vesta
Ceres (dwarf planet)
Spacecraft launched by Delta II rockets
Space probes launched in 2007
Derelict space probes
Articles containing video clips
Space probes decommissioned in 2018